The 1989 Philadelphia Wings season marked the team's third season of operation. In 1989, the Eagle Pro Box Lacrosse League changed its name to the Major Indoor Lacrosse League.

The Wings also made a move on the field that season, winning their first league championship. This was the first of a record six National Lacrosse league titles. They recorded 7 wins and 2 losses while once again drawing upon an ever increasing home base, with a total home attendance of 74,876 (14,975 per game).

Star players Brad Kotz and Tony Resch led the team.

Game log
Reference:

(p) - denotes playoff game
 * MILL Championship

1989 Highlights
 The Wings drew a total of 74,876 fans at home, 14,975 per game.
 Brad Kotz led the league with 50 points and 31 goals, John Tucker led the league with 28 assists.
 The Wings won the first of their league record six total championships.

Roster
Reference: WingsZone History Archive

See also
 1989 MILL season
 List of NLL Championships won
 Philadelphia Wings

References

External links
Wingzone Stats Article 1989 Season
Bible of Lacrosse Video 1989 MILL Championship Philadelphia Wings vs New York Saints

Philadelphia Wings seasons
Phil
1989 in lacrosse